Tokerau is an islet in Penrhyn Atoll (Tongareva) in the Cook Islands. It is on the northern edge of the atoll, between Tekasi and Painko. The island was once inhabited and contains a marae, Tokerau.

References

Penrhyn atoll